Alec Marantz (born January 31, 1959) is an American linguist and researcher in the fields of syntax, morphology, and neurolinguistics.

Until 2007, he was Kenan Sahin Distinguished Professor of Linguistics at Massachusetts Institute of Technology, and Research Director of KIT/MIT MEG Joint Research Lab. Since 2007, he has been Professor of Linguistics and Psychology at New York University.

Since the 1980s Marantz has made significant contributions to syntactic theory, especially regarding the structural representation of syntactic arguments, and the semantic and morphological implications of this representation. In the early 1990s Marantz proposed (together with Morris Halle) a theory of architecture of grammar known as Distributed Morphology. More recently, he has been using magnetoencephalography (MEG) to study human language processing, particularly morphology and the mental lexicon.

Marantz's approach to linguistic theory is characterized by its emphasis on the empirical base of linguistics, including (but not necessarily limited to) evidence from native-speaker intuitions, child language, language processing, and the neural organization of language.

External links 
 Personal website
 Departmental website
  Distributed Morphology
 KIT/MIT MEG Joint Research Lab
  Recent Publications

Linguists from the United States
Living people
MIT School of Humanities, Arts, and Social Sciences faculty
Massachusetts Institute of Technology alumni
Oberlin College alumni
Morphologists
1959 births